César Suárez (born  October 16, 1984) is a Venezuelan professional racing cyclist.

Career highlights
 2005: 3rd in General Classification Vuelta a Sucre (VEN)
 2008: 1st in Stage 9 Vuelta al Tachira, San Cristóbal (VEN)

See also
Glossary of cycling
History of cycling
List of cyclists
Outline of cycling

References

External links

Venezuelan male cyclists
1984 births
Living people
Place of birth missing (living people)